Robert Lee Jun-fai (born 16 December 1948) is a Hong Kong musician. He is the younger brother of martial artist Bruce Lee.

Early life
Lee was born on 16 December 1948 in Hong Kong as the youngest son of Grace Ho and Lee Hoi-chuen, a leading Chinese Cantonese opera and film actor of the 1940s.

Career 
Lee was the founder of a Hong Kong beat band called The Thunderbirds, a beat group in the same Hong Kong/Macau musical scene as Danny Diaz & The Checkmates, Zoundcrakers, Anders Nelson & The Inspiration, D'Topnotes and Teddy Robin & The Playboys. He founded the group in 1966 and quickly became famous in Hong Kong. A few singles were sung mostly or all in English. Also released was Lee singing a duet with Irene Ryder.

He later moved to Los Angeles in the United States and stayed with his older brother Bruce Lee. After Bruce's death, Robert released an album dedicated to him called The Ballad of Bruce Lee. A single of the same title was also released.

On 27 November 2005, Robert unveiled a Bruce Lee statue in Hong Kong, celebrating what would have been Bruce's 65th birthday. He is the producer of the 2010 film Bruce Lee, My Brother.

Personal life 
Lee is the younger brother of Phoebe Lee, Agnes Lee, Peter Lee, and Bruce Lee. He is the uncle of Shannon Lee and Brandon Lee.

In 1977, Lee married Hong Kong singer and actress Sylvia Lai, who performed under the stage name of Sum Sum. They had a son named Clarence Lee Ka-Ho in 1980, and divorced in 1983.

Discography

Singles
Ballad of Bruce Lee – Sunrise 906 – 1974 (USA)
Irene Ryder & Robert Lee – Baby baby / You put me down – HK Columbia CHK-1028 – 196?
EP
The Thunderbirds & The Nautics – ECHK 513 – 196?

Album
Ballad of Bruce Lee – Sunrise LP-R905 – 1974 (USA)

Compilation
Various Artists: Uncle Ray's Choice – Baby Baby – Irene Ryder & Robert Lee (1968)- EMI – 2003

References

External links

 
Interview with Robert Lee

Hear

1948 births
Cantonese people
Hong Kong male singers
Hong Kong people of English descent
Living people
Family of Bruce Lee